The enzyme sterol esterase (EC 3.1.1.13) catalyzes the reaction

a sterol ester + H2O  a sterol + a fatty acid

This enzyme belongs to the family of hydrolases, specifically those acting on carboxylic ester bonds.  The systematic name is steryl-ester acylhydrolase. Other names in common use include cholesterol esterase, cholesteryl ester synthase, triterpenol esterase, cholesteryl esterase, cholesteryl ester hydrolase, sterol ester hydrolase, cholesterol ester hydrolase, cholesterase, and acylcholesterol lipase.  This enzyme participates in bile acid biosynthesis.

References

 
 
 
 

EC 3.1.1
Enzymes of known structure